Belaichari is an upazila of Rangamati District in the division of Chittagong, Bangladesh.

Geography
It has a total area 745.92 km2.

Demographics

According to the 2011 Bangladesh census, Belaichhari Upazila had 6,063 households and a population of 28,525, 8.6% of whom lived in urban areas. 11.7% of the population was under the age of 5. The literacy rate (age 7 and over) was 32.8%, compared to the national average of 51.8%.

Administration
Belaichari Upazila is divided into three union parishads: Belaichari, Farua, and Kengrachari. The union parishads are subdivided into 9 mauzas and 59 villages.

See also
 Upazilas of Bangladesh
 Districts of Bangladesh
 Divisions of Bangladesh

References

Upazilas of Rangamati Hill District